Chroma Cutlery (also known as Chroma Cnife, and styled CHROMA) is a kitchen knife-maker based in Demorest, Georgia, US, founded in 1989. Chroma also produces spice grinders, knife sharpening stones, kitchen shears and other cooking accessories. The company also manufactures products for other brands.

Overview 
The company is owned by Garwick Industries Ltd.. Chroma's main market is Europe.

The Chroma knife range starts from $ 20USD for a quality Chinese made knife to $25,000USD by an original knife of Japanese Master Okishiba Masakuni.

Product line 

Chroma's main series - besides others - include:
Type 301 – a stainless steel knife range designed by German designer F. A. Porsche in cooperation with professional chefs
Haiku classic – a traditional Japanese kitchen knife range with wooden ‘’honoki handle’’ and ‘’Megugiki pin’’
Haiku Kurouchi a non stainless steel,  knife range made in the ancient style of Tosa Region of Japan
Sharpening stones – whetstones for knives
ProCuTe – a spice grinder with titanium cutting gear

Professional users 
Chroma knives target professional users. Some celebrity chefs like Bocuse d'or winners use Chroma knives. The knives are most popular in European countries, primarily Germany, France, Sweden and Belgium.

Awards
Focus Way of Life – International Design Award, Federal German State Baden-Württemberg, 2002 for Chroma type 301 
Formexpriset 2003 – Stockholmmässan Nordic Design Award, 2003 for Chroma type 301
Adolf Loos Staatspreis Design 2003 –    for Chroma type 301
IF Design Award 2005 – for Chroma type 301 
Stiftung Warentest, Germany: Knife Test: Chroma Haiku 2nd Place 
Der Feinschmecker "Must have" – "Product of the month" of Germany's leading Gourmet magazine, May 2010 for Chroma ProCuTe Spice Grinder
Best knife in test – for Chroma type 301 P-18 by "Test Fakta" – Nordic Test institute, Sweden – for best quality and performance

References

External links
Chroma
The making of a CHROMA Cnife

Companies established in 1989
Kitchen knife brands
Kitchenware brands
Knife manufacturing companies